The 2010 Elections for the Illinois House of Representatives was conducted on Tuesday, November 2, 2010. The 2010 primary election was conducted on Tuesday, February 2, 2010. State Representatives are elected for two-year terms, with the entire House of Representatives up for a vote every two years.

Overview

General election

Notable races

District 54
Long-time Republican incumbent Suzanne Bassi, a moderate, lost in the primary to conservative Tom Morrison (campaign site, PVS), co-owner of a Servpro franchise with his brother, in an upset. Morrison is facing Democratic nominee Matt Flamm (campaign site, PVS), senior partner in a business and real estate law practice in Chicago. The Pioneer Press endorsed Flamm on October 14, 2010.

The 54th District includes portions of Palatine, Barrington, Barrington Hills, Inverness, Hoffman Estates and Rolling Meadows.
Daily Herald candidate questionnaire
Campaign contributions at National Institute for Money in State Politics: Suzanne Bassi, Matt Flamm, Tom Morrison

See also
Illinois Senate elections, 2010
Illinois House of Representatives

References

General Election 2010: Offices and Candidates from the Illinois State Board of Elections

External links
Illinois State Board of Elections
Illinois General Assembly - Illinois State Representatives, 96th General Assembly

2010 Illinois elections
2010
Illinois House of Representatives